Moonshiner(s) or The Moonshiner(s) may refer to:

Moonshiner, one who makes moonshine, illegal distilled alcohol
"The Moonshiner", a traditional folk song
The Moonshiner (film), a 1904 American short silent action film
The Moonshiners (1907 film) (Salaviinanpolttajat), a Finnish film directed by Louis Sparre and Teuvo Puro
The Moonshiners (1916 film), an American short film directed by Fatty Arbuckle
Moonshiners (TV series), an American docudrama series, beginning in 2011